This list of Florida Southern College alumni includes graduates and former students of Florida Southern College.

References 

Florida Southern College